Thakurdwara is a town in Moradabad district in the indian state of Uttar Pradesh.

Location
Thakurdwara is 15 km from Kashipur. The township has been very large part of erstwhile UP and now a thriving in the north of Uttar Pradesh.

Geography
The city is situated on Ramnagar-Kashipur-Moradabad Road. Thakurdwara is at just 12 km distance from Kashipur, 48 km distance from its District Main City Moradabad, 218 km distance from National Capital New Delhi and 411 km distance from Awadh Capital Lucknow.

Tourism
The world famous Jim Corbett National Park is just 52 km away from it. The Ramganga Dam(Kalagarh Dam) is 46 km away.

Infrastructure and Transport
The town's nearest Railway Station is Kashipur, Uttarakhand (12 km). The nearest International Airport is Indira Gandhi International Airport, New Delhi, 218 km away. Another near Airport is 72 km away at Pantnagar. But the airport has only single flight on Fri, Sat, Sun, Wed for New Delhi operated by Alliance Air (India).

Demographics
 India census, Thakurdwara had a population of 4875. Males constitute 52% of the population and females 48%. Thakurdwara has an average literacy rate of 78%, higher than the national average of 85%: male literacy is 89%, and female literacy is 80%. In Thakurdwara, 11% of the population is under 6 years of age .

Industry
Major sources of income of Thakurdwara are -
 Agriculture, 
 Handloom. 

Pasupati Acrylon Limited is spread over an area of approximately 90 acres. Pasupati Acrylon has a manufacturing capacity of 42000 MT/Annum of Acrylic fibre. Pasupati Acrylon supplies its Acrylic fiber under the brand name ‘ACRYLON'.

References 

Cities and towns in Moradabad district